The minister of emergency preparedness  is a minister of the Crown in the Canadian Cabinet. The officeholder is one of two ministers (the other being the minister of public safety) responsible for administering the Department of Public Safety and Emergency Preparedness.

History 
The department was previously administered by a single minister, styled Minister of Public Safety and Emergency Preparedness. The role was split by Prime Minister Justin Trudeau in a Cabinet shuffle following the 2021 federal election.

List of ministers
Key:

See also

 Minister of Public Safety

References

External links 
 Public Safety Canada

Emergency Preparedness
Federal departments and agencies of Canada
Emergency services in Canada
Emergency management in Canada